Cor Brom (27 August 1932 – 29 October 2008) was a Dutch football player and manager.

Playing career
During his playing career, Brom played as a midfielder with Zwarte Schapen, VSV, Limburgia and Telstar.

Managerial career
After retiring as a player, Brom managed Vitesse Arnhem from 1969 to 1972, Fortuna SC from 1972 to 1976, Sparta Rotterdam from 1976 to 1978, Ajax from 1978 to 1979, RWD Molenbeek from 1981 to 1982, and FC Zwolle from 1982 to 1984.

He was dismissed by Ajax's new chairman Ton Harmsen in 1979 after allegedly taking payments and gifts (a horse and the meat of a whole pig), meant for the players, from an amateur side who played Ajax in pre-season.

Later life and death
Brom died in Amsterdam on 29 October 2008, of Parkinson's disease.

References

1932 births
2008 deaths
Footballers from Amsterdam
Deaths from Parkinson's disease
Neurological disease deaths in the Netherlands
Dutch footballers
Association football midfielders
SC Telstar players
Dutch football managers
SBV Vitesse managers
Fortuna Sittard managers
Sparta Rotterdam managers
AFC Ajax managers
K.R.C. Genk managers
R.W.D. Molenbeek managers
PEC Zwolle managers
FC Wacker Innsbruck managers
MVV Maastricht managers
Dutch expatriate football managers
Dutch expatriate sportspeople in Belgium
Expatriate football managers in Belgium
Dutch expatriate sportspeople in Austria
Expatriate football managers in Austria